A list of roads designated A1, sorted by alphabetical order of country.

 A01 highway (Afghanistan), a long ring road or beltway connecting Kabul, Kandahar, Herat and Mazar
 A1 motorway (Albania), connecting Durrës and Kukës
 A001 highway (Argentina), a beltway surrounding the city of Buenos Aires
 A1 road (Australia) may refer to several roads part of the highway 1 including the following segments: 
 A1 highway (Queensland), connecting Kybong and Cairns
 A1 highway (South Australia), connecting Victoria via Mount Gambier, Adelaide and Port Augusta to Western Australia
 A1 highway (Victoria), connecting New South Wales via Melbourne and Portland to South Australia
 A1 (New South Wales), consisting of several discrete sections including the Princes Highway and Pacific Highway
 A1 motorway (Austria), connecting Vienna and Salzburg.
 A1 motorway (Belgium), connecting Brussels, Antwerp and Breda
 A1 highway (Bosnia and Herzegovina), carrying Corridor Vc
 A1 highway (Botswana), connecting Gaborone and Francistown
 A1 motorway (Bulgaria), connecting Sofia and Burgas via Plovdiv
 A1 road (Canada) may refer to a class of provincial roads in Manitoba, Canada: see for instance Manitoba Provincial Road 280
 A1 motorway (Croatia), connecting Zagreb and Split and continuing to Dubrovnik
 A1 motorway (Cuba), connecting Havana to Sancti Spíritus, largely under construction
 A1 motorway (Cyprus), connecting Nicosia and Limassol
 A1 road (France) may refer to:
 A1 motorway (France), connecting Paris and Lille
 A1 motorway (Martinique), connecting Aimé Césaire International Airport in Le Lamentin and Fort-de-France
 A1 motorway (Germany), connecting Oldenburg, Holstein and Saarbrücken
A1 motorway (Greece), the principal north–south motorway, connecting Athens with Thessaloniki and the Macedonian border
 A1 road (Isle of Man), connecting Douglas and Peel
 A1 motorway (Italy), connecting Milan and Naples
 A1 road (Jamaica), connecting Kingston and Lucea
 A1 road (Jersey), connecting St. Helier and St. Aubin
 A1 highway (Kazakhstan), connecting Nur-Sultan and Petropavl
 A1 road (Kenya), connecting Tanzania and the Sudanese border
 A1 road (Latvia), connecting Riga and Ainaži
 A1 highway (Lithuania), connecting Vilnius and Klaipėda
 A1 motorway (Luxembourg), connecting Luxembourg City and the German A64
 A1 road (Malaysia) may refer to:
 A1 road (Perak), connecting Chemor and Ipoh 
 A1 road (Sabah), connecting Kota Kinabalu and Kudat
 A1 motorway (Morocco), connecting Rabat and Tanger
 A1 road (Namibia), connecting Windhoek and Okahandja, and consisting of sections formerly designated B1 upgraded to freeway
 A1 motorway (Netherlands), connecting Amsterdam and Oldenzaal at the German border
 A1 highway (Nigeria), connecting Lagos to Niger in the north
 A1 motorway (North Macedonia), connecting Serbian and Greek borders
 A1 road (People's Republic of China) may refer to:
 Yingbin Expressway, previously designated A1, now designated S1, in Shanghai
 A1 highway (Poland), connecting north to south Poland
 A1 motorway (Portugal), connecting Lisbon and Porto
 A1 motorway (Romania), connecting Bucharest to Nădlac, at the Nădlac II–Csanádpalota border (Romania–Hungary)
 A1 motorway (Serbia), connecting Horgoš at the Hungarian border and Preševo at the Macedonian border via Belgrade
 A1 motorway (Slovenia), connecting Šentilj at the Austrian border and Koper via Maribor and Ljubljana
 A1 road (Spain) may refer to:
 A-1 motorway (Spain), connecting Madrid and Irún at the French border
 A1 motorway (Aragon), connecting Villafranca de Ebro and El Burgo de Ebro
 A1 motorway (Extremadura), connecting Navalmoral de la Mata and Alcántara at the border with Portugal
 A1 highway (Sri Lanka), connecting Colombo and Kandy
 A1 motorway (Switzerland), connecting St Margrethen and Geneva
 A1 motorway (Tunisia), connecting Tunis and Sfax 
 A1 road (United Kingdom) may refer to:
 A1 road (Great Britain), connecting London and Edinburgh
 A1 road in London, the London section of the A1 road
 A1 in Newcastle upon Tyne, the Newcastle upon Tyne section of the A1 road
 A1 road (Northern Ireland), connecting Belfast and Newry
 A1 road (United States of America) may refer to:
 Interstate A-1, connecting the Glenn Highway and the Canada–US border
 Florida State Road A1A
 County Route A1 (California), in Lassen County connecting Route 36 near Susanville and Route 139 near Eagle Lake
 A-1 corridor (Georgia), connecting State Route 400 and Dahlonega
 A1 road (Zimbabwe), connecting Harare and Chirundu

See also 
 List of highways numbered 1

References